The Kensington Division was one of four divisions of the Hundred of Ossulstone, in the county of Middlesex, England.
The other divisions were named Finsbury, Holborn and Tower. Ossulstone hundred was divided in the seventeenth century, with each of the four divisions replacing the hundred for most administrative purposes.

Area
The division lay to the west and north west of the liberty of Westminster, and in 1889 it was divided, part passing to the new County of London and part remaining in Middlesex.

The area is now covered by four London Boroughs: Hammersmith and Fulham, Kensington and Chelsea, most of Ealing and part of Hounslow.

Constituent Parishes
The Kensington Division contained the following "parishes, townships, precincts and places" in 1829:

The parish of Kensington
The parish of St Luke, Chelsea
The parish of Fulham
The hamlet of Hammersmith
The parish of Chiswick
The parish of Ealing
The parish of Acton

External links
 Map of the Divisions of Ossulstone Hundred at British History Online

Hundreds and divisions of Middlesex
History of local government in London (pre-1855)